The Commonwealth Railway, Inc.  is a United States Class III short-line railroad operating  of track of a former Norfolk, Franklin and Danville Railway line from Suffolk, Virginia, to Portsmouth, Virginia. The main office is in the Wilroy area of Suffolk.  Commonwealth Railway is owned by Genesee & Wyoming Inc. and is a part of Norfolk Southern's "Thoroughbred Shortline Program". It interchanges with Norfolk Southern in Suffolk. 

An important industry on the line was the BASF Chemical plant in the West Norfolk area of Portsmouth. The plant was usually switched by locomotive #444, a GP16 class locomotive rebuilt by Seaboard Coast Line Railroad in the early 1980s. The main locomotive was #517, a CF7 rebuild of an EMD F7 performed by the Atchison, Topeka and Santa Fe Railway in the 1970s.

The BASF plant closed in 2007 and was subsequently demolished. A small chemical company remains on the site.

Another important industry is APM Terminals, which is a modern shipping container port in Portsmouth along the Elizabeth River. This port was leased by Maersk to the Virginia Port Authority in late 2010. Commonwealth Railway is the only rail line to access the port. Another port is planned for Craney Island; however, as of 2020 the port is still in the planning stage and has not been constructed. 

With the opening of this new container port, two EMD SW1500 switch engines were added to the roster. To handle the container traffic to and from the port, the Commonwealth Railway line through the city of Portsmouth has been realigned down the medians of I-664 and SR 164, at a cost of $60 million. A small marshaling yard was built in the Baileytown area of Suffolk. Double-stack container service started in December 2010. A second phase, paid for by $9 million in federal stimulus funding, will further improve port access and is expected to be completed in September 2011.

The Commonwealth Railway had two GP20 locomotives numbered 2090 and 2091 which were sold in 2019 to Larry's Truck & Electric (LTEX) in McDonald, Ohio. By 2020 the Commonwealth Railway operated only one locomotive, an EMD GP15-1 numbered 1424, leased from LTEX. The company's remaining EMD SW1500, No. 1551, is leased to the International Paper Company in Franklin, Virginia.

References

External links

 Commonwealth Railway official webpage - Genesee and Wyoming website
 Pictures of CWRY Locomotives
 Virginia Port Authority Engineering Project 

Virginia railroads
Genesee & Wyoming
Spin-offs of the Norfolk Southern Railway
1989 establishments in Virginia